Michał Cholewa (1980–present) is a Polish fantasy and science fiction writer. His 2014 book Forta won the Janusz A. Zajdel Award.

Works
 Algorytm wojny series
 Gambit, WarBook 2012
 Punkt cięcia, WarBook 2013
 Forta, WarBook 2014
 Inwit, WarBook 2016
 Echa , WarBook 2017
 Sente, WarBook 2018

References

1980 births
Polish science fiction writers
Living people